Go to the Sugar Altar is the first album by The Kelley Deal 6000, released in 1996. It was released on Kelley Deal's own record label, Nice Records.

Critical reception
The Washington Post wrote that the "album of pithy art-punk tunes soon dissipates into a series of cryptic musical sketches, but such opening songs as 'Canyon' and 'How About Hero' out-Pixie the Amps (Kim's latest band)."

Track listing
"Canyon" (Kelley Deal) – 3:10 
"How About Hero" (Kelley Deal, Jesse Colin Roff) – 2:43 
"Dammit" (Kelley Deal, Jesse Colin Roff) – 2:40
"Sugar" (Kelley Deal, Dave Shouse) – 4:17
"A Hundred Tires" (Kelley Deal) – 1:48
"Head of the Cult" (Kelley Deal) – 1:51
"Nice" (Kelley Deal, Jesse Colin Roff) – 3:31
"Trixie Delicious" (Kelley Deal, Jimmy Flemion, Dave Shouse, Jesse Colin Roff) – 3:12
"Marooned" (Kelley Deal) – 2:08
"Tick Tock" (Kelley Deal, Jimmy Flemion) – 2:00
"Mr. Goodnight" (Kelley Deal, Jesse Colin Roff) – 3:36

Members
 Kelley Deal: Vocals, Guitar
 Nick Hook: Drums
 Marty Nedich: Bass
 Steve Salett: Guitar
Guest musicians
 Jimmy Flemion: Vocals, Guitar
 Jason Orris: Bass
 Jesse Colin Roff: Drums, Guitar, Trumpet, Castanets
 Dave Shouse: Bass, Guitar, Lap Steel, Hammond Organ

References

1996 debut albums